Young Hoon Lee (born 19 November 1954) is a South Korean Pentecostal pastor. He has been the senior pastor of the church Yoido Full Gospel Church in Seoul since 2008.

Biography 
Lee was born on November 19, 1954, in Seoul, South Korea. He grew up in a Christian family, and in April 1964, he joined Yoido Full Gospel Church.

Lee studied theology at Yonsei University in Seoul. After graduating, he attended the Full Gospel Theology Seminary (now Hansei University) in Gunpo, and later attended the United Graduate School of Theology at Yonsei University, ultimately earning a master's degree in theology. Lee became ordained as a pastor in 1982. Afterwards, he earned another master's degree in theology at Westminster Theological Seminary in the United States, and later earned an MA and a PhD in religion and philosophy at Temple University.

Lee and his wife, Inja Baek, have a daughter together.

Ministry 
He began his ministry as pastor of Yoido Full Gospel Church in 1977.

In 2008, he succeeded David Yonggi Cho as senior pastor of Yoido Full Gospel Church.

He also became Superintendent of Assemblies of God of South Korea Yoido General Council in 2009.

In 2016, he became president of the Christian Council of Korea.

See also

Christianity in Korea

References

External links
 

1954 births
Living people
South Korean Assemblies of God pastors
South Korean evangelicals
People from Seoul